Qarakh Bolagh (also Romanized as Qarakh Bolāgh and Qerkh Bolāgh; also known as Farrokh Bolāgh) is a village in Sanjabad-e Shomali Rural District, in the Central District of Kowsar County, Ardabil Province, Iran. At the 2006 census, its population was 66, in 14 families.

References 

Towns and villages in Kowsar County